Asad Rauf (Punjabi, ; 12 May 1956 – 14 September 2022) was a Pakistani cricket player and umpire. He was a member of the ICC Elite Umpire Panel from 2006 to 2013. Alleged to have been involved in match-fixing and spot-fixing of cricket matches, he was found guilty of corruption by the Board of Control for Cricket in India in February 2016 and banned for five years.

Early life and playing career
Rauf was born in Lahore, Punjab, on 12 May 1956.  He played in Pakistani domestic cricket between 1977 and 1991, representing Pakistan Universities, Lahore, National Bank of Pakistan and Pakistan Railways.

Umpiring career
Rauf became a first-class umpire in 1998.  In February 2000, the Pakistan Cricket Board appointed him to his first One Day International (ODI), the match between Pakistan and Sri Lanka at Gujranwala, Pakistan, on 16 February that year.  With the promotion of Aleem Dar to the ICC Elite Umpire Panel three years later, Rauf was included in the International Panel of Umpires for the first time.  In January 2005, the ICC appointed him to his first test match, the fixture between Bangladesh and Zimbabwe at Chittagong (MAA).  He then stood in the Boxing Day Test at the Melbourne Cricket Ground between Australia and South Africa later that year in December.  He was subsequently promoted to the Emirates Elite Panel of ICC Umpires in April of the following year.  In September 2012, Rauf umpired the ICC World Twenty20 group stage match between India and Afghanistan.

From the time of his inclusion in the Elite Panel of ICC Umpires in 2006, Rauf umpired in 64 Tests, 139 one-day internationals and 28 Twenty20 internationals.  He was ultimately dropped from the ICC Elite Panel of Umpires after an annual review of their performance in June 2013.  The council maintained that this was unrelated to his connection with the police investigation into spot-fixing.  He consequently resigned as an umpire altogether.

2013 IPL spot-fixing
Rauf's name cropped up during the 2013 IPL spot fixing controversy, prompting the ICC to remove him from the panel of match officials for the 2013 Champions Trophy.
He was charged in September 2013 by Mumbai Police with illegal betting, cheating and fraud. He denied the allegations but refused to go to Mumbai to face the charges. In February 2016, Rauf was found guilty and was banned for five years.

Personal life
Upon his retirement from umpiring in cricket in 2016, Rauf operated a shoe shop in Lahore.

Rauf died on 14 September 2022 in Lahore.  He was 66, and suffered cardiac arrest prior to his death.

See also
 List of Test cricket umpires
 List of One Day International cricket umpires
 List of Twenty20 International cricket umpires

References

External links
 
 
 ICC Umpires and Referees

1956 births
2022 deaths
Lahore City Whites cricketers
Pakistan Universities cricketers
Pakistani Test cricket umpires
Pakistani One Day International cricket umpires
Pakistani Twenty20 International cricket umpires
Pakistani cricketers
National Bank of Pakistan cricketers
Cricketers from Lahore
Pakistan Railways cricketers
Cricketers banned for corruption
Government Islamia College alumni